Tarna Mare is a commune of 4,435 inhabitants situated in Satu Mare County, Romania. It is composed of four villages: Bocicău (Bocskó), Tarna Mare, Valea Seacă (Avaspatak) and Văgaș (Nagytarnafürdő).

References

Communes in Satu Mare County